"Hi, Hi, Hi" is a song written by Paul and Linda McCartney and performed by Wings. It was released as a double A-side single with "C Moon" in 1972. The song was recorded around the same time as "C Moon", in September 1972.

Release
The single peaked at number one in Spain, number five in the United Kingdom and at number 10 in the United States in January 1973. The song became a staple of Wings' live shows in the 1970s.

The song was included on the 2001 Paul McCartney compilation album Wingspan: Hits and History and as a bonus track on the 1993 and 2018 reissues of Red Rose Speedway.

It was also included on The 7" Singles Box in 2022.

Reception
Cash Box described it as "good old rock 'n roll as only the McCartney's can perform it, but with lyrics that more than suggest."

Ban
In the UK, the song was banned by the BBC for its sexually suggestive lyrical content. The BBC also assumed that the title phrase, "We're gonna get hi, hi, hi" was a drug reference. The specific lyrics objected to is the apparent phrase "get you ready for my body gun"; McCartney has said that the correct lyrics are "get you ready for my polygon", an abstract image, and later said, "The BBC got some of the words wrong. But I suppose it is a bit of a dirty song if sex is dirty and naughty. I was in a sensuous mood in Spain when I wrote it." Furthermore, Paul refers back to the song when it's played for a live audience—"Yeah, well, the great laugh is when we go live, it makes a great announcement. You can say "This one was banned!" and everyone goes "Hooray!" The audience love it, you know. "This next one was banned," and then you get raving, because everyone likes to. Everyone’s a bit anti-all-that-banning, all that censorship. Our crew, our generation, really doesn't dig that stuff, as I'm sure you know."

Personnel
The musicians who played on the song are as follows:
Paul McCartney – vocals, rhythm guitar, bass guitar
Linda McCartney – backing vocals, organ
Denny Laine – backing vocals, rhythm guitar
Henry McCullough – lead guitar
Denny Seiwell – drums, cowbell

References

1972 singles
1972 songs
1973 singles
Apple Records singles
Music published by MPL Music Publishing
Songs banned by the BBC
Paul McCartney songs
Song recordings produced by Paul McCartney
Songs written by Linda McCartney
Songs written by Paul McCartney
Paul McCartney and Wings songs